The European Community number (EC number) is a unique seven-digit identifier that was assigned to substances for regulatory purposes within the European Union by the European Commission. The EC Inventory comprises three individual inventories, EINECS, ELINCS and the NLP list.

Structure 
The EC number may be written in a general form as: NNN-NNN-R, where R is a check digit and N represents integers. The check digit is calculated using the ISBN method. According to this method, the check digit R is the following sum modulo 11:

If the remainder R is equal to 10, that combination of digits is not used for an EC number. To illustrate, the EC number of dexamethasone is 200-003-9. N1 is 2, N2 through N5 are 0, and N6 is 3. 

The remainder is 9, which is the check digit.

There is a set of 181 ELINCS numbers (EC numbers starting with 4) for which the checksum by the above algorithm is 10 and the number has not been skipped but issued with a checksum of 1.

EC Inventory 
The EC Inventory includes the substances in the following inventories. The content of these inventories is fixed and official.

List numbers 
European Chemicals Agency (ECHA) also applies the EC number format to what it calls "List number". The number are assigned under the REACH Regulation without being legally recognised. Hence, they are not official because they have not been published in the Official Journal of the European Union. List numbers are administrative tools only and shall not be used for any official purposes.

See also
 Registration, Evaluation, Authorisation and Restriction of Chemicals
 European chemical Substances Information System
 CAS registry number

References

External links

Chemical numbering schemes
European Union law
Regulation of chemicals in the European Union